= Brazilian Bombshell: The Biography of Carmen Miranda =

1989 book by Martha Gil-Montero

- Author: Martha Gil-Montero
- Language: English
- Subject: Carmen Miranda
- Genre: Biography
- Publisher: Penguin Publishing Group
- Publication date: 25 March 1989
- Publication place: United States
- Media type: Hardcover
- Pages: 352
- ISBN: 9781556111280

Brazilian Bombshell: The Biography of Carmen Miranda is a 1989 biographical book written by Martha Gil-Montero. It was published by Penguin Publishing and released in the United States on March 25, 1989.

== Synopsis ==
Here for the first time is the life and career of the woman who more than lived up to her moniker—The Brazilian Bombshell. The adored Ambassadress of Samba to the United States and the world, her daring style would influence a generation of North and South American women and is alive and well today in the styles of Liza Minnelli, Bette Midler, Cher, Madonna and Cyndi Lauper.

== Reception ==
The Washington Post said "Brazilian Bombshell is exactly the kind of biography that Carmen Miranda deserves: affectionate and generous, but honest and realistic".
